Pig's ear  may refer to:

Pig's ear (food)
Pig's ear (pastry)
Pigs Ear, Pennsylvania
Cotyledon orbiculata, a flowering succulent plant
Gomphus clavatus, an edible species of fungus
Discina perlata, a species of fungus